Alexander James Rodman (born 15 February 1987) is an English semi-professional footballer who plays as a winger for  club Bristol Rovers.

Rodman was a schoolboy with Aston Villa and Wolverhampton Wanderers before playing in the youth teams of Arden Forest and Coleshill Town. He started his senior career after signing for Leamington in 2005. After one season he signed with Grantham Town, leaving them in 2007 before having spells with Lincoln United, Gainsborough Trinity and Nuneaton Borough. He signed for Tamworth in 2008, winning the Conference North title in his first season with the club. After a season-and-a-half of playing for them in the Conference Premier, Rodman signed for League Two club Aldershot Town in 2011. He had a loan spell with York City from 2012 to 2013 before joining Grimsby Town. He helped them to the Conference Premier play-offs before moving to Gateshead in 2014. After one season with them he joined Newport County of League Two in 2015.

Club career

Early career
Born in Sutton Coldfield, West Midlands, Rodman played schoolboy football with Aston Villa and Wolverhampton Wanderers and in the youth teams of Arden Forest and Coleshill Town. He began his senior career after signing for Midland Football Alliance club Leamington in 2005, with whom was named as the 2005–06 FA Cup's "Player of the Round" for the third qualifying round following a 2–0 win over Woodford United. This helped Leamington to a first round tie against League One team Colchester United, which Rodman playing in as the team were beaten 9–1. He made 41 appearances and scored five goals for Leamington in the 2005–06 season, playing mostly as a right wing-back and a midfielder.

Rodman signed for Northern Premier League Premier Division club Grantham Town at the start of the 2006–07 season, after an unsuccessful trial with Alfreton Town. Having finished the season with 33 appearances and two goals for Grantham, he signed for Lincoln United of the Northern Premier League Premier Division in July 2007 after Grantham's relegation to the Northern Premier League Division One South. He scored five goals in 20 appearances for United before signing for Conference North club Gainsborough Trinity in November 2007, making his debut as a substitute in a 1–0 defeat away to Burscough on 3 November. Having scored two goals in 12 appearances, he departed Gainsborough for league rivals Nuneaton Borough in January 2008. He made his debut on 26 January as a substitute in a 3–0 home win over Workington, before scoring his first goal on 22 March in a 3–2 defeat away to Kettering Town. He scored two goals in 17 appearances for Nuneaton.

Tamworth
Rodman signed for Tamworth on 30 May 2008 on a one-year contract with Nuneaton experiencing financial difficulties. He finished the 2008–09 season with 10 goals in 40 appearances as Tamworth won the Conference North title. In June 2009, he signed a new one-year contract ahead, of their return to the Conference Premier. Following his first season with Tamworth back in the Conference Premier, in which he scored two goals in 24 appearances, Rodman went on trial with League One club Notts County. After the trial came to an end Rodman signed a new one-year contract with Tamworth in July 2010. One of Rodman's last matches for Tamworth was against Newport County on 11 January 2011, in which he scored a hat-trick, impressing County's Aldershot Town-bound manager Dean Holdsworth.

Aldershot Town

Rodman left Tamworth to join League Two club Aldershot Town on 26 January 2011 on a two-and-a-half-year contract for an undisclosed fee. He made his first appearance for Aldershot on 29 January 2011 after coming off the bench at Gillingham to replace Wade Small in the 49th minute. Rodman scored a late consolation goal in a 2–1 defeat with a 25-yard shot during stoppage time. He finished the season with five goals in 14 appearances for Aldershot. Rodman missed the rest of the 2011–12 season after being diagnosed with a pulmonary embolism during January 2012, after tests showed he had three blood clots in his lungs. He had made 26 appearances and scored two goals for Aldershot up to that point in the 2011–12 season. He resumed training during the pre-season of 2012.

Rodman signed for Aldershot's League Two rivals York City on 7 November 2012 on a two-month loan. He made his debut after starting York's 3–0 defeat at home to AFC Wimbledon on 10 November 2012, but was substituted in the 58th minute. He scored his first goal in his next appearance, in a 2–2 draw away to Port Vale on 17 November 2012. After making eight appearances and scoring one goal for York, the loan was extended until the end of the 2012–13 season in January 2013. Rodman was sent back to Aldershot on 4 April 2013 having been deemed surplus to requirements by new manager Nigel Worthington. He had scored one goal in 18 appearances for York.

Grimsby Town
Rodman along with the entire Aldershot squad were released following the club's relegation to the Conference Premier and subsequent entry into financial administration that followed. He signed a one-year contract with Grimsby Town of the Conference Premier on 8 July 2013. Rodman left the club on 12 May 2014 after deciding not to activate the clause for a further year in his contract.

Gateshead
After a move to Scottish Championship club Hibernian broke down, Rodman signed for Gateshead of the Conference Premier on a one-year contract on 14 July 2014. He made his debut on 9 August 2014 in a 3–1 home win against Torquay United. Rodman scored his first goal for Gateshead on 16 August 2014 in a 2–2 draw away to Eastleigh. He made 44 appearances and scored 11 goals in the 2014–15 season as Gateshead finished 10th in the Conference Premier table.

Newport County
Rodman signed for League Two club Newport County on a one-year contract on 9 June 2015. He made his debut for Newport on 8 August 2015 in the League Two match against Cambridge United. Rodman was offered a new contract by Newport at the end of the 2015–16 season but chose to move on.

Notts County
Rodman signed for Notts County on 24 June 2016.

Shrewsbury Town
After half a season at Notts County, Rodman was allowed to leave on a free transfer, joining League One club Shrewsbury Town on 5 January 2017 on an 18-month contract. He made his debut two days later in a 1–1 draw away to Swindon Town, and scored his first goal for the club, a 63rd-minute equaliser against Gillingham, on 28 January. Rodman made 20 appearances, scoring once, to help Shrewsbury avoid relegation at the end of his first half season at the club.

Bristol Rovers
After turning down a new contract with Shrewsbury, Rodman signed for their League One rivals Bristol Rovers on 2 July 2018 on a contract of undisclosed length. He scored his first goal when he opened the scoring in a 2–1 defeat away to Sunderland on 15 December 2018. Rodman concluded the 2018–19 season with two goals in a 2–1 comeback victory over Barnsley. 

Rodman missed the start of the 2020–21 season after an illness that saw him suffering from bouts of vertigo. He made his return to first-team action on 26 December 2020, in a 2–0 defeat at Milton Keynes Dons. Rodman had a run in the team under Rovers' third manager of the season Joey Barton, a run in which Rodman scored an impressive second goal as they won 4–1 against Accrington Stanley to help in their battle against relegation. On 14 April 2021, Rodman was awarded the PFA Players in the Community award for League One for his work in education through the club.

In September 2021, Rodman suffered a broken foot in training that manager Joey Barton estimated would keep him out for around three months. In January 2022 he made his return to the matchday squad as an unused substitute in a 1–0 win over Walsall. In March however, Barton revealed that Rodman had suffered another injury setback and was likely to miss the rest of the season. Rodman made only four appearances across the season, all of which came in August, as Rovers were promoted on the final day of the season, a 7–0 victory seeing the club move into the final automatic promotion place on goals scored.

In July 2022, Barton revealed that with Rodman having been unable to take part in Rovers' summer training programme, he was not in Barton's plans to feature at all for the upcoming 2022–23 season. Rodman's contract situation was revealed also with him entering the new season on heavily reduced terms as a result of his contract negotiation with previous CEO Martyn Starnes. In August 2022, it was revealed that Rodman was training away from the first-team having been told that his future lay away from the club.

International career

Futsal
Rodman has represented England in futsal, making five appearances between 2006 and 2007, and had also been a member of the English and British Universities squad whilst studying Business at Nottingham Trent University.

England C
Rodman made his England C debut on 26 May 2010 against the Republic of Ireland, coming on as an 89th-minute substitute. He made his second appearance on 15 September 2010 against Wales semi-pro, scoring the second goal in a 2–2 draw. Rodman was then picked for the squad that would play Belgium on 9 February 2011 but withdrew due to becoming a Football League player.

Career statistics

Honours
Tamworth
Conference North: 2008–09

Shrewsbury Town
EFL Trophy runner-up: 2017–18

References

External links

Profile at the Bristol Rovers F.C. website

1987 births
Living people
Sportspeople from Sutton Coldfield
Footballers from the West Midlands (county)
English footballers
Association football wingers
Aston Villa F.C. players
Wolverhampton Wanderers F.C. players
Coleshill Town F.C. players
Leamington F.C. players
Grantham Town F.C. players
Lincoln United F.C. players
Gainsborough Trinity F.C. players
Nuneaton Borough F.C. players
Tamworth F.C. players
Aldershot Town F.C. players
York City F.C. players
Grimsby Town F.C. players
Gateshead F.C. players
Newport County A.F.C. players
Notts County F.C. players
Shrewsbury Town F.C. players
Bristol Rovers F.C. players
Midland Football Alliance players
Northern Premier League players
National League (English football) players
English Football League players
England semi-pro international footballers
English men's futsal players
Alumni of Nottingham Trent University